Mohamed Mintu Sheikh (born 1990 in Magura) is a Bangladeshi footballer who last played for Dhaka Mohammedan and for the Bangladesh national team.

Career
Mintu made his top tier debut with  Feni SC, in 2009. Mintu was one of the main architects of the Bangladesh U23 team's gold win at the 2010 South Asian Games, held in Dhaka. He also made his debut for the senior team the same year, during a 2-1 victory over Tajikistan. His performances in the international stage resulted in a competition between Abahani Liited and Sheikh Jamal DC to earn Mintu's signature. Both the clubs named Mintu in their team for the 2012 league season, leading to Abahani sending a complaint to the Bangladesh Football Federation. They soon withdrew the complaint and Mintu went on to join Sheikh Jamal DC. The following year Mintu signed for Mohammedan SC, and in 2013, Mintu scored the winning penalty against Sheikh Russel KC, as Mohammedan SC won the 2013 Super Cup. He became the historic teams captain in 2018.

Controversy
On 19 November 2018, Mintu was arrested, however, had soon been granted bail in a case under Dowry Prevention Act in Bangladesh.

References

1990 births
Living people
Bangladeshi footballers
People from Magura District
Footballers at the 2010 Asian Games
Association football defenders
Asian Games competitors for Bangladesh
Sheikh Russel KC players
Feni SC players
Mohammedan SC (Dhaka) players
Bangladesh international footballers